The 1969 Formula One season was the 23rd season of the FIA's Formula One motor racing. It featured the 20th World Championship of Drivers and the 12th International Cup for F1 Manufacturers, which commenced on 1 March 1969 and ended on 19 October after eleven races. The season also included four non-championship races. British driver Jackie Stewart won the first of his titles with Matra-Ford.

Championship summary

Matra, which had entered Formula One the previous year, withdrew their works team from the 1969 championship and focused on their partnership with Ken Tyrrell. Stewart won the 1969 title easily with the new Matra MS80, which corrected most of the weaknesses of the MS10. Stewart's title was the first won by a French chassis, and the only one won by a chassis built in France. It would also be the only time a constructor won in Formula One without fielding a works team.

Jacky Ickx had a strong second half to the season for Brabham, winning in Germany and Canada, after Jack Brabham was sidelined by a testing accident. Ickx finished second in the Drivers' Championship, with 37 points to Jackie Stewart's 63.

The season was the second to see the use of add-on aerodynamic devices, which were experimented with by some teams in the 1968 season. After several incidents in which wings, struts, or the suspension (to which they were attached) collapsed, wings were banned from the Monaco Grand Prix onward. They were reintroduced later in the season but were to be restricted in size and height, and attached directly to the chassis in a fixed position.

1969 also saw a brief resurgence of interest in four wheel drive following a number of wet races the previous year. Four such cars were entered for the British Grand Prix, and Johnny Servoz-Gavin became the one and only driver to score a point with a 4WD, finishing sixth with the Matra MS84 at the Canadian Grand Prix. At the same race, Al Pease made history by being the only driver disqualified from a World Championship event for being too slow. Wide tyres and downforce quickly proved to be superior means of increasing grip, and the technology was largely abandoned, although Lotus continued to experiment with the idea for a few more years. Bruce McLaren described the handling of his M9 as being like trying to sign an autograph while someone was jogging his elbow; Cosworth discovered that their car handled better with more power directed to the rear wheels.

1969 was the first year in which genuine safety measures were implemented at circuits. The cars were going far faster over time, particularly with the increased engine capacity rules for 1966 onwards from 1.5 litres uncompressed to 3 litres uncompressed or 1.5 litres compressed, and the role that manipulated aerodynamics began to play in the cars' performance. The Montjuïc circuit in Barcelona was a first in Grand Prix racing- the circuit was completely Armco-lined. Although safety measures in 1969 were still nearly non-existent compared to today's modern safety standards, these measures were a new step forward to protect drivers (and spectators) from further harm. About half the circuits in Formula One at this time had some safety standards, such as Silverstone Circuit, Magdalena Mixhuca in Mexico City and (less so) Monaco; although other circuits were nearly unchanged from previous years, such as the Nürburgring in Germany and the Clermont-Ferrand circuit in France; both were twisty mountain road circuits with all kinds of unprotected drop offs and solid obstacles on the sides of both circuits. Another example was the feared Spa-Francorchamps circuit in Belgium, an extremely fast public road circuit which was located in a similar area and had similar dangers to the Nürburgring and Clermont-Ferrand. The Belgian Grand Prix, originally to be held on 8 June between the Monaco and Dutch Grands Prix, was boycotted by many of the drivers because of the extreme danger of the track after an overall inspection of Spa by Jackie Stewart, who was responsible for most of the activities in Formula One to try to make it safer. He demanded changes to the circuit that the track owners did not want to pay for, so the race was boycotted and eventually cancelled. Spa was included in 1970 after Armco was added to some parts of the track.

Calendar

Calendar changes
The South African Grand Prix was moved from its January date in 1968 to early March for 1969.

The Spanish Grand Prix was moved from Jarama to Montjuïc, in keeping with the event-sharing arrangement between the two circuits.

The French Grand Prix was moved from Rouen-Les-Essarts to Charade due to safety concerns at Rouen after Jo Schlesser was killed in the 1968 French Grand Prix.

The British Grand Prix was moved from Brands Hatch to Silverstone, in keeping with the event-sharing arrangement between the two circuits.

The Canadian Grand Prix was moved from Mont-Tremblant to Mosport Park, in keeping with the event-sharing arrangement between the two circuits.

The Mexican Grand Prix was moved back to its October schedule for 1969, the 1968 race was held in November two weeks later than usual to avoid a clash with the 1968 Summer Olympics which was held in October at Mexico City.

The Belgian Grand Prix was originally to be held on 8 June, but was cancelled after the drivers boycotted the Grand Prix because of the extreme dangers of the Circuit de Spa-Francorchamps after an overall inspection of Spa was done by Jackie Stewart, who was responsible for most of the activities in Formula One to try to make it safer. He demanded changes to the circuit that the track owners didn't want to pay for.

Entries

The following teams and drivers competed in the 1969 FIA World Championship.

 Pink background denotes F2 entrants to the German Grand Prix.

Results and standings

Grands Prix

World Drivers' Championship standings

Points were awarded on a 9–6–4–3–2–1 basis for the top six finishers at each Grand Prix. However, only the best five results from the first six races and the best four results from the last five races counted towards the World Championship.

1 – Ineligible for Formula One points, because they drove with Formula Two cars.
Formula 2 cars occupied the positions between fifth and tenth at the German GP, but the drivers who drove these cars did not earn points for the championship. The fifth and sixth points went to the eleventh and twelfth in the race, Siffert and Beltoise.

International Cup for F1 Manufacturers standings
Points were awarded on a 9–6–4–3–2–1 basis to the first six finishers at each round, however only the best placed car from each manufacturer was eligible to score points. The best five results from the first six rounds and the best four results from the last five rounds were retained.

Bold results counted to championship totals.

Non-championship races
Other Formula One races were held in 1969, which did not count towards the World Championship. The Madrid Grand Prix and Gold Cup were held concurrently with Formula 5000 cars.

References

Formula One seasons